The CAA Centre (formerly the Brampton Centre for Sports & Entertainment and the Powerade Centre) is a 5,000-seat multi-purpose arena in Brampton, Ontario, Canada. It was built in 1998, and officially opened the same year on October 7. Its main arena was home to the Brampton Battalion of the Ontario Hockey League, the Brampton Beast of the ECHL, and the Brampton Excelsiors lacrosse teams. Starting In 2023 the arena will be home to the Brampton Honey Badgers of the Canadian Elite Basketball League

In the main arena the seats are purple, with private suites located around the top of seating area. The club seats are on the penalty box side of the arena. There is a video scoreboard that was added for the Brampton Beast's inaugural season. The concourse is horseshoe-shaped.

The main arena is part of larger community complex that includes three smaller ice pads and outdoor softball diamonds. It is located at 7575 Kennedy Road, on the south side of the city, between Steeles Avenue and Highway 407.

The arena also annually hosts the Canadian International Kabaddi tournament, also called the Canada Kabaddi World Cup.

Cricket

The grounds hosted the 2019 Global T20 Canada tournament.

References

External links
 Official site

Indoor arenas in Ontario
Indoor ice hockey venues in Ontario
Ontario Hockey League arenas
Sports venues in Ontario
Sport in Brampton
Indoor lacrosse venues in Canada
Buildings and structures in Brampton
Tourist attractions in Brampton
Kabaddi venues
Brampton A's
Public–private partnership projects in Canada